Grangeville is a census-designated place (CDP) in Kings County, California, United States. It is part of the Hanford–Corcoran Metropolitan Statistical Area. The population was 469 at the 2010 Census.

A post office operated at Grangeville from 1874 to 1920.

Grangeville was founded in 1874 by James A. Hackett and Peter Kanawyer. It is the oldest existing community in Kings County.  When the Southern Pacific Railroad bypassed Grangeville in 1876, the thriving new community dwindled in size and importance.

Demographics

The 2010 United States Census reported that Grangeville had a population of 469. The racial makeup of Grangeville was 393 (83.8%) White, 15 (3.2%) African American, 5 (1.1%) Native American, 5 (1.1%) Asian, 0 (0.0%) Pacific Islander, 41 (8.7%) from other races, and 10 (2.1%) from two or more races. Hispanic or Latino of any race were 145 persons (30.9%).

The Census reported that 469 people (100% of the population) lived in households, 0 (0%) lived in non-institutionalized group quarters, and 0 (0%) were institutionalized.

There were 162 households, out of which 66 (40.7%) had children under the age of 18 living in them, 108 (66.7%) were opposite-sex married couples living together, 12 (7.4%) had a female householder with no husband present, 6 (3.7%) had a male householder with no wife present.  There were 5 (3.1%) unmarried opposite-sex partnerships, and 0 (0%) same-sex married couples or partnerships. 32 households (19.8%) were made up of individuals, and 11 (6.8%) had someone living alone who was 65 years of age or older. The average household size was 2.90.  There were 126 families (77.8% of all households); the average family size was 3.37.

The population was spread out, with 145 people (30.9%) under the age of 18, 33 people (7.0%) aged 18 to 24, 105 people (22.4%) aged 25 to 44, 134 people (28.6%) aged 45 to 64, and 52 people (11.1%) who were 65 years of age or older.  The median age was 37.1 years. For every 100 females, there were 112.2 males.  For every 100 females age 18 and over, there were 117.4 males.

The homeowner vacancy rate was 0%; the rental vacancy rate was 1.9%.  353 people (75.3% of the population) lived in owner-occupied housing units and 116 people (24.7%) lived in rental housing units.

References

Census-designated places in Kings County, California
Census-designated places in California